Vi burde ses noget mere is the debut album of the Danish Europop duo, Hej Matematik.

The album was released on February 4, 2008, with eleven songs. Later on, it was re-released adding the successful single "Walkmand". The special edition with the single included earned the band many more fans due to the chart success of "Walkmand" that reached #3.

The album is regarded as a disc of "Smart Pop", this because the lyrics of the song have been written to represent the urban atmosphere that presents the lifestyle of "Hej Matematik."

Track listing
"Hej matematik"
"Du & jeg"
"Centerpubben"
"Midtbyen"
"Utroskabet"
"Høj 5"
"Gymnastik"
"Vi ka alt vi to"
"Kvinderne"
"Vi burde ses noget mere"
"Så ka de lære det"

Special edition
12. "Walkmand"

Singles
"Gymnastik"
"Centerpubben"	
"Du & Jeg"
"Vi ka' alt vi to"
Hej Matematik"
"Walkmand" (from the special edition of the album)

Credits
Track 1, 4, 6: Co-produced by Claus Norreen
Track 1: Guitar by Thomas Troelsen
Track 9: Guitar by Hilmer Hassig
Track 5: Vocals by Christina Boelskifte
Track 8: Vocals by Lene
Mastering by Jan Eliasson
Track 3, 7: Mixed by Mads Nilsson
Track 1, 2, 4, 5, 6, 8, 9, 10, 11: Mixed by Nicolaj Rasted

Charts

Notes

2008 debut albums
Danish-language albums